Andromeda is a sculpture by the French artist Auguste Rodin, named after Andromeda. It is one of the sculptures produced as part of his The Gates of Hell project and appears on the left door next to the personification of Day and on the right door as part of the group showing a falling winged genius.

Exhibitions
It was exhibited for the first time in 1889 at the Galerie Georges Petit in a joint exhibition with Claude Monet.

Praise
The poet Rainer Maria Rilke praised the work's expressive quality, which he held to be more disperse, grandiose and mysterious than simply showing the figure's facial expression.

See also
List of sculptures by Auguste Rodin

References

External links

Sculptures by Auguste Rodin
1889 sculptures
Plaster sculptures